The Roman Catholic Diocese of Šibenik is a diocese located in the city of Šibenik in the Ecclesiastical province of Split-Makarska in Croatia.

History
 May 1, 1298: Established as Diocese of Šibenik

Leadership
 Bishops of Šibenik (Roman rite)
 Bishop Tomislav Rogić (since 2016.07.25)
 Bishop Ante Ivas (1997.02.05-2016.07.25)
 Bishop Srećko Badurina, T.O.R. (1987.12.04 – 1996.09.17)
 Bishop Anton Tamarut (1986.02.05 – 1987.12.04)
 Bishop Josip Arnerić (1961.07.17 – 1986.02.05)
 Bishop Ćiril Banić (1961 – 1961.02.03)
 Bishop Ćiril Banić (Apostolic Administrator 1951.03.28 – 1961)
 Bishop Jeronim Mileta, O.F.M. Conv. (1922.02.14 – 1947.11.23)
 Bishop Luca Pappafava (1911.11.27 – 1918.09.14)
 Archbishop Vinko Pulišić (1903.11.09 – 1910.06.16)
 Bishop Matteo Zannoni (1895.03.18 – 1903)
 Bishop Giovanni Maiorosy (1885.07.27 – ?)
 Bishop Antonio Innocente Giuseppe Fosco (1876.04.07 – 1894)
 Bishop Jovan Zaffron (1863.09.28 – 1872)
 Archbishop Pietro Alessandro Doimo Maupas (1855.12.20 – 1862.05.21)

See also
Roman Catholicism in Croatia

References

Sources
 GCatholic.org
 Catholic Hierarchy
  Diocese website

Roman Catholic dioceses in Croatia
1298 establishments in Europe
Dioceses established in the 13th century